Hugo  is a city  north of downtown Saint Paul in Washington County in the U.S. state of Minnesota. The population was 14,767 at the 2020 census. The city lies north of White Bear Lake on the border of the metropolitan boundary. Hugo and nearby suburbs comprise the northeast portion of Minneapolis-St. Paul, the sixteenth largest metropolitan area in the United States.

The city's largest lake, Oneka Lake, is named for the Dakota word "onakan," which means "to strike or knock off," rice into a canoe. Just south is Rice Lake where Mdewakanton Dakota from Mendota gathered wild rice.

History
Originally settled by French Canadians, Hugo early on established itself as a refueling station for the Lake Superior and Mississippi Railroad (later the Northern Pacific Railway). Located in Oneka township, the community was first named Centerville Station and finally Hugo. The naming of Hugo is still uncertain. Local histories point to the French novelist, Victor Hugo, as its namesake due to the abundance of French-Canadian settlers in the area and the writer's tremendous popularity at the time. Duluth mayor, Trevanion William Hugo, is also said to have given Hugo its name; however, the name "Hugo" was already being used by the village post office before Trevanion Hugo emigrated from Canada. The Oneka Township surrounding the area was also named by the French-Canadians settling the area. Oneka was derived from the Dakota word "onakan" meaning to strike or knock off rice into a canoe. The village incorporated in 1906 and was officially incorporated as a city in 1972. After 2000, Hugo had absorbed significant suburban growth and development to become the thriving city it is today.

Geography

The city is bound by Elmcrest Avenue North on its west, Keystone Avenue North on its east, 180th Street North on its north, and 120th Street North on its south.  A major route within the city is U.S. Highway 61, which runs north–south. Interstate 35E is not within the city limits, but is heavily used by Hugo residents.  It is located just west of Hugo. Washington County Road 8/Anoka County Road 14 connects U.S. 61 to Interstate 35E.

Demographics

2020 census 
At the 2020 census there were 15, 766 people in 5,512 households. The population per square mile is not updated in the most recent census. The racial makeup of the city was 94.7% White, 1.0% African American, 0.0% Native American, 2.4% Asian, and 1.8% from two or more races. Hispanic or Latino of any race were 2.9%.

Of the 5,512 households 40.4% had children under the age of 18 living with them, 60.8% were married couples living together, 9.2% had a female householder with no husband present, 4.2% had a male householder with no wife present, and 25.8% were non-families. 19.6% of households were one person and 3.8% were one person aged 65 or older. The average household size was 2.67 and the average family size was 3.09.

25.9% of the population was under 18 years of age, 7.3% under 5, and 11.6% over 65. The population of Hugo is also 51% female.

2010 census
At the 2010 census there were 13,332 people in 4,990 households, including 3,704 families, in the city. The racial makeup of the city was 94.2% White, 0.7% African American, 0.3% Native American, 3.1% Asian, 0.6% from other races, and 1.0% from two or more races. Hispanic or Latino of any race were 2.2%.

Of the 4,990 households 40.4% had children under the age of 18 living with them, 60.8% were married couples living together, 9.2% had a female householder with no husband present, 4.2% had a male householder with no wife present, and 25.8% were non-families. 19.6% of households were one person and 3.8% were one person aged 65 or older. The average household size was 2.67 and the average family size was 3.09.

The median age was 33.7 years. 27.9% of residents were under the age of 18; 6.3% were between the ages of 18 and 24; 33.9% were from 25 to 44; 24.2% were from 45 to 64; and 7.8% were 65 or older. The gender makeup of the city was 49.2% male and 50.8% female.

2000 census
At the 2000 census there were 6,363 people in 2,125 households, including 1,742 families, in the city. The racial makeup of the city was 97.76% White, 0.18% African American, 0.42% Native American, 1.03% Asian, 0.05% Pacific Islander, 0.20% from other races, and 0.53% from two or more races. Hispanic or Latino of any race were 1.05%.

Of the 2,125 households 45.1% had children under the age of 18 living with them, 71.5% were married couples living together, 6.7% had a female householder with no husband present, and 18.0% were non-families. 12.7% of households were one person and 2.6% were one person aged 65 or older.  The average household size was 2.99 and the average family size was 3.30.

The age distribution was 31.3% under the age of 18, 6.5% from 18 to 24, 34.6% from 25 to 44, 22.7% from 45 to 64, and 4.9% 65 or older.  The median age was 34 years. For every 100 females, there were 104.7 males.  For every 100 females age 18 and over, there were 105.6 males.

The median household income was $63,450 and the median family income  was $65,222. Males had a median income of $44,069 versus $31,110 for females. The per capita income for the city was $24,334.  About 1.4% of families and 1.5% of the population were below the poverty line, including 0.9% of those under age 18 and 6.1% of those age 65 or over.

See also
Withrow, Minnesota

References

External links
City website
The Citizen newspaper site

Cities in Minnesota
Cities in Washington County, Minnesota
Populated places established in 1850
1850 establishments in Minnesota Territory